Ivan Stambolić (5 November 1936 – 25 August 2000) was a Serbian politician. He was a prominent member of the League of Communists of Serbia who served as the President of the Presidency of Serbia in the 1980s.

In August 2000, he was assassinated. His uncle was politician Petar Stambolić.

Career
Stambolić graduated from the University of Belgrade's Law School. In May 1986, he became the President of Serbia. He was a mentor and a close personal friend to Slobodan Milošević, and supported him in the elections for the new leader of the League of Communists of Serbia, to the dismay of the other leaders in the party. Stambolić spent three days advocating Milošević's election and finally managed to secure him a tight victory, the tightest ever in the history of Serbian Communist Party internal elections.

Stambolić and Milošević held similar views on the autonomous provinces of Serbia, Kosovo and Vojvodina, both feeling that constitutional changes were necessary to sort out their relationship with the centre. Stambolić managed to win over the League of Communists of Yugoslavia to his position on this matter at the Thirteenth Congress of the LCY, held in 1986, and then set up a commission to work out the details of the constitutional reforms that were eventually passed in 1989. He also wanted to protect the rights of Serbs and Montenegrins in Kosovo, insisting as early as 1982 that he would speak up for those rights even if his opponents labelled him a Greater Serbian nationalist. Where Milošević and he differed on these matters was Milošević's demand for greater rapidity and his stronger sympathy for Serb demonstrators. It was the issue of speed that was to bring the two into conflict.

Stambolić and the Serbian government joined the federal Yugoslav government in harshly condemning the controversial Memorandum of the Serbian Academy of Sciences and Arts of 1986 for inciting nationalism. Stambolić said:

"We [communist party leaders] do not accept the Memorandum’s call for Serbia to turn its back on its own future and the future of Yugoslavia, for it to arbitrarily accuse the proven leaders of the revolution and of socialist development, for Serbian Communists to be seen as the illegitimate leaders of the working class and people of Serbia".

Dragiša Pavlović, Milošević's fairly liberal successor at the head of the Belgrade Committee of the party, opposed his policy towards the solving of the issues of the Kosovo Serbs, calling it "hastily promised speed". Milošević denounced Pavlović as being soft on Albanian radicals, contrary to advice from Stambolić. On 23/24 September 1987, at the subsequent eighth session of the Central Committee, one that lasted around 30 hours, and was broadcast live on the state television, Milošević had Pavlović deposed, to the utter embarrassment of Stambolić, who resigned under pressure from Milošević's supporters a few days later.

In December 1987, Stambolić was officially voted off the position and replaced by Petar Gračanin, who was in turn succeeded the following year by Milošević himself.

Disappearance and death
Stambolić mysteriously disappeared on 25 August 2000, still during the rule of Slobodan Milošević. On 28 March 2003, the police revealed that he was murdered on Fruška Gora by eight Special Operations Unit officers. On 18 July 2005, these men and their co-conspirators were found guilty of the murder of Stambolić and were sentenced to between 15 and 40 years in prison. The court found that the order for Stambolić's murder came from Slobodan Milošević.

References

External links

Obituary: Ivan Stambolić, The Independent, 29 March 2003

1936 births
2000 deaths
People from Ivanjica
Serbian bankers
Assassinated Serbian politicians
Assassinations in Serbia
People murdered in Serbia
Presidents of Serbia within Yugoslavia
League of Communists of Serbia politicians
University of Belgrade Faculty of Law alumni
2000 murders in Europe